Harrison L. Richardson (1930 - February 26, 2009) was an American lawyer and politician from Maine. A Republican, Richardson served three terms in the Maine House of Representatives (1965-1971) and one term in the Maine Senate (1973–75). He represented Cumberland in the Legislature.

Political career
Richardson was a proponent of Maine's first income tax, which was adopted in 1969 due to a crisis in funding mental health. He was also an early advocate of container deposit legislation, which was eventually adopted by the State in 1978. During his final two terms in the House, Richardson served as the Majority Leader. He unsuccessfully sought the Republican nomination for Governor of Maine in 1974, losing to James Erwin. He also served two terms on the University of Maine Board of Trustees. He was also a trustee at Maine Maritime Academy and the American University in Bulgaria.

Professional career
A well-known trial lawyer, Richardson was named a Fellow to the American College of Trial Lawyers in 1975.

Personal
Richardson played with the University of Maine football team, where was an All-New England tackle. He served in the United States Marine Corps, including 14 months in Korea. He died on February 26, 2009, at his home in Gorham.

References

1930 births
2009 deaths
People from Cumberland, Maine
Politicians from Gorham, Maine
Maine Black Bears football players
United States Marine Corps personnel of the Korean War
Majority leaders of the Maine House of Representatives
Republican Party Maine state senators
Maine lawyers
20th-century American politicians
Players of American football from Maine
20th-century American lawyers